The Worshipful Company of Furniture Makers referred to as The Furniture Makers' Company, is one of the Livery Companies of the City of London. The organisation was formed in 1952, and was granted Livery status by the City in 1963 being the 83rd in order of precedence.  Its church is St Mary-le-Bow

The Furniture Makers' Company is the British furnishing industry's central organisation, charity and patron.

History 
The Furniture Makers' Company was formed originally as a guild in 1952 before being established as the 83rd livery company of the City of London in 1963. Their charity however was established over 100 years ago as the Furnishing Trades Benevolent Association (FTBA), later known as the Furnishing Industry Trust (FIT), dedicated to helping people in the furnishing industry in times of hardship. The Furniture Makers’ Company merged with FIT in 2013.

In 2007 the company acquired the freehold of 12 Austin Friars - Furniture Makers' Hall.  Austin Friar has subsequently become the name of their main publication. The Furniture Makers' Hall was built in 1882 and still has many of the original Victorian features from when it was built, as well as bespoke wood furniture and fittings, including an ornate oak staircase running through the centre of the building. The Hall was purchased outright in 2007 and has been refurbished to create a venue for membership events.

Links with industry 
The company is made up of its members who come from many professions and disciplines, but who all have a common link by being engaged in or with the British furnishing industry.

Its Guild Mark scheme, a modern equivalent of the trading standards once regulated by the medieval guilds, gives accreditation to designers, craftsmen and manufacturers involved in British furniture production.

References

Furniture Makers
1951 establishments in England
British furniture